Nanasipauʻu Tukuʻaho, (née The Honourable Nanasipauʻu Vaea; born 8 March 1954) is Queen of Tonga since 2012, as the wife of King Tupou VI.

Early life 
Nanasipauʻu Vaea is the daughter of the late Baron Vaea, a former Prime Minister of Tonga from 1991 to 2000, and the late Baroness Tuputupu Vaea. She has six siblings:
Dowager Lady Luseane Luani, born Luseane Vaea (widow of Sione Laumanuʻuli Luani).
ʻAlipate Tuʻivanuavou, Lord Vaea, who married the sister of Lord Fakafānua, Siatukimoana Fakafānua Vaea, The Honourable Lady Vaea. She is the paternal aunt of Crown Princess Sinaitakala.
Lady ʻAmelia Luoluafetuʻu, born ʻAmelia Luoluafetuʻu Vaea (former-wife of The Noble Lasike).
 Dame Cassandra Vaea, (formerly Cassandra Tuku'aho) former-wife of Prince Tuipelehake (formerly Viliami Sione Ngu Takeivulai Tuku'aho) son of Tu'ipelehake (Mailefihi) and his former wife Mele Vikatolia Faletau.
 Moimoikimofuta Kaifahina Vaea.
Ratu Edward Palalaika 'a Tungi Vaea.

Marriage 
She was married at the Chapel Royal, at the Royal Palace, in Nukuʻalofa on 11 December 1982 to Tupou VI and the couple have three children and four grandchildren:
Princess Lātūfuipeka Tukuʻaho - ʻAngelika Lātūfuipeka Halaʻevalu Mataʻaho Napuaʻokalani Tukuʻaho (17 November 1983).  She followed her father's steps to be the current High Commissioner to Australia since 22 August 2012.
Crown Prince Tupoutoʻa ʻUlukalala – Siaosi Manumataongo ʻAlaivahamamaʻo ʻAhoʻeitu Konstantin Tukuʻaho (17 September 1985, Nukuʻalofa). He married on 12 July 2012 the Sinaitakala Fakafanua, daughter of High Chief Kinikinilau Fakafanua and Princess Ofeina, Lady Fakafanua, both King Tupou VI's first cousins. They have a son and 3 daughters:
Prince Taufaʻahau Manumataongo – Taufaʻahau Manumataongo (born 10 May 2013, Auckland City Hospital).
Princess Halaevalu Mata'aho (born 12 July 2015, Auckland City Hospital).
Princess Nanasipau’u (born March 20, 2018, Auckland Hospital in Auckland).
Princess Salote Mafile’o Pilolevu (born February 25, 2021, Calvary Hospital in Canberra).
Prince Ata – Viliami ʻUnuaki-ʻo-Tonga Mumui Lalaka-Mo-e-ʻEiki Tukuʻaho (Nukuʻalofa, 27 April 1988).

Notable published works 
 Kaeppler, A.L.; Taumoefolau, M.; Tukuʻaho, N., & Wood-Ellem, E. (2004): Songs and poems of Queen Salote.

Titles and honours 

8 March 1954 – 11 December 1982: The Honorable Nanasipauʻu Vaea
11 December 1982 – 10 September 2006: Her Royal Highness Princess Nanasipauʻu Tukuʻaho of Tonga
10 September 2006 – 18 March 2012: Her Royal Highness Princess Nanasipauʻu Tukuʻaho, The Crown Princess of Tonga
Since 18 March 2012: Her Majesty Queen Nanasipauʻu, The Queen of Tonga

Honours

Orders 
:
  Recipient of the King George Tupou V Royal Family Order (1 August 2011)
 Dame Grand Cross with Collar of the Order of Queen Salote Tupou III (30 June 2015)
 Dame Grand Cross of the  Most Devoted Order of the Royal Household Order of Tonga

Medals 
:
  Recipient of the King Taufa’ahau Tupou IV Coronation Silver Jubilee Medal (4 July 1992)
 Recipient of the King George Tupou V Coronation Medal (1 August 2008)
 Recipient of the King George Tupou VI Coronation Medal (4 July 2015)

Ancestry

Family tree

References 

Living people
1954 births
Tongan royal consorts
Tongan women
Place of birth missing (living people)
20th-century Tongan women
21st-century Tongan women
20th-century Tongan people
21st-century Tongan people
People from Nukuʻalofa